is a Japanese manga series written and illustrated by Tamiki Wakaki. It has been serialized in Shogakukan's seinen manga magazine Weekly Big Comic Spirits since March 2020.

Media

Manga
Written and illustrated by Tamiki Wakaki, 365 Days to the Wedding has been serialized in Shogakukan's seinen manga magazine Weekly Big Comic Spirits since March 16, 2020. Shogakukan has collected its chapters into individual tankōbon volumes. The first volume was released on August 7, 2020. As of January 12, 2023, nine volumes have been released.

On February 8, 2023, Seven Seas Entertainment announced that they licensed the manga.

Volume list

Drama
In July 2022, it was announced that the manga would receive a television drama adaptation. The drama stars Wakana Aoi and Kanta Sato as the two lead characters, and was directed by Ryō Miyawaki and Hitomi Kitagawa, with scripts by Keiko Kaname and Akahiko Takaishi and music composed by Ryo Yoshimata. The ten-episode series premiered on October 7, 2022, on Amazon Prime Video in Japan and select territories, under the title "Map for The Wedding".

References

External links
  
 

Marriage in anime and manga
Romantic comedy anime and manga
Seinen manga
Seven Seas Entertainment titles
Shogakukan manga